The football sporting event at the 1921 Far Eastern Championship Games featured matches between China, Japan and the Philippines.

China was represented by the club side South China AA, who reportedly had beaten East China (Shanghai) for the right to do so: Before the tournament, on 26 May, China (South China A.A.) played a practice match against "a team representing East China" at Nanyang Field in front of 3,000 people, which they won 3-1.

Results

Winner

Statistics

Goalscorers

Aftermath
After the tournament, at least two matches were played in the Open International Championship:

"Great Britain" was a selection of British residents in Shanghai

References

1921 in Chinese sport
Football at the Far Eastern Championship Games
International association football competitions hosted by China
1921 in Asian football